The MSA British Rally Championship is a rallying series run over the course of a year, that comprises six tarmac and gravel surface events. 2020 was to be the 62nd season of the series. The season began in the forests of Wales on 8 February and was due to conclude on 19 September in Southern Scotland.

Series cancellation

On 9 June 2020, due to the ongoing COVID-19 pandemic organisers of the British Rally Championship took the decision to cancel the 2020 championship. The coronavirus pandemic continued to spread leading to a number of events being cancelled with round 1, the Cambrian Rally,  being the only event to take place.

2020 calendar

The 2020 championship was to be contested over five rounds in six different territories England, Scotland, Wales, Northern Ireland, Ireland and Belgium and was to be held on both tarmac and gravel surfaces. 

West Cork Rally
Rally Tendring & Clacton
Ulster Rally
Galloway Hills Rally
Wales Rally GB

Due to the COVID-19 pandemic the organisers of the West Cork Rally, the Rally Tendring & Clacton, the Ulster Rally  and the Galloway Hills Rally  announced that the events would be cancelled. The reserve event, the Wales Rally GB was also cancelled.

The Ypres Rally due to take place in June was postponed until November, but on 30 October the rally was cancelled due to evolution of the virus cases in Belgium.

Event results

Podium places and information on each event.

References

British Rally Championship seasons
Rally Championship
British Rally Championship
British